Maine was one of the first states to mark their state highway system. From 1914 to 1925, Maine used a system of lettered highways to designate cross-state routes. This system was the first of its kind in the United States coordinated by a single state, predating Wisconsin's system by three years. In 1919, this system was supplanted by a series of auto trails officially created by the State Highway Commission, though it is unclear as to whether this system completely supplanted the lettering system. Both systems were abandoned by 1925 in favor of the New England interstate highway system.

List 
In 1919, the Maine Automobile Association and the Maine State Highway Commission collaborated to create a series of state-designated auto trails. The system posed a stark contrast to the auto trail systems of other states, which were often private endeavors, with improvements by these booster organizations ranging from simple marked poles to paving and maintenance of the road. It is unclear which routes listed below existed at what times.

References 

State highways in Maine
auto trails
Maine